James Peter Garner (born 27 January 1972) is a former English cricketer.  Garner was a right-handed batsman who fielded as a wicket-keeper.  He was born in Tittleshall, Norfolk and educated at Felsted School.

Garner made his debut for Norfolk in the 1991 Minor Counties Championship against Hertfordshire.  Garner played Minor counties cricket for Norfolk from 1991 to 2002, which included 19 Minor Counties Championship matches and 18 MCCA Knockout Trophy matches.   He made his List A debut against Cornwall in the 2000 NatWest Trophy.  He made 5 further List A appearances, the last coming against Kent in the 2002 Cheltenham & Gloucester Trophy.  In his 6 List A matches, he scored 54 runs at an average of 10.80, with a high score of 27.

References

External links
James Garner at ESPNcricinfo
James Garner at CricketArchive

1972 births
Living people
People from Tittleshall
English cricketers
Norfolk cricketers
People educated at Felsted School
Sportspeople from Norfolk
Wicket-keepers